Sedeprivationism is a doctrinal position within Traditionalist Catholicism which holds that the current occupant of the Holy See is a duly-elected pope, but lacks the authority and ability to teach or to govern unless he recants the changes brought by the Second Vatican Council. The doctrine asserts that since this council, occupants of the See of Peter are popes materialiter sed non formaliter, that is "materially but not formally". As such, sedeprivationists teach that Pope John XXIII, Pope Paul VI, Pope John Paul I, Pope John Paul II, and Pope Benedict XVI  have not attained fullness of the papacy.

Sedeprivationism is held by some traditionalist Catholic groups such as the Istituto Mater Boni Consilii and Orthodox Roman Catholic Movement, among others. The doctrine of Sedeprivationism traces its origin to the Thesis of Cassiciacum of the Dominican Catholic theologian Michel-Louis Guérard des Lauriers.

Etymology 
The etymology of the term sedeprivationist "means that there is a privation in the occupant of the chair of Saint Peter, i.e. something lacking." "Sedeprivationism" is composed of "sede" ("see" in Latin) and "privationism" (Latin "privatio", meaning "privation", and the suffix "ism").

American sedeprivationist Bishop Donald Sanborn, however, disagrees with the use of the name, calling it "a completely dumb name". He explained in 2009 that:

History
The doctrine of sedeprivationism was formulated by the French Dominican theologian Michel-Louis Guérard des Lauriers (1898–1988). His thesis is known as the Thesis of Cassiciacum, because it was first published in the magazine Cahiers de Cassiciacum ("Notes from Cassiciacum"), in the first issue of the magazine, in 1979. He was excommunicated in 1983.

The thesis states that John Paul II, like predecessors who came after John XXIII, was Pope only materially and not formally, and so was the valid electee of the October 1978 conclave. Although he never became Pope, he equally has never forfeited his claim on the papacy.

Thesis of Cassiciacum 

The Thesis of Cassiciacum, which asserts the position of sedeprivationism, states that the See of Peter is not obtained and must conform with one of two prescribed requirements of a legitimate papal election by the popes:

 The pope must be elected legitimately by valid designated electors. That aspect designates the papal candidate as materially elected and designated candidate to the office of pope.
 The newly chosen pope-elect must express his acceptance and that on giving his assent he receives from Christ the form of the papacy: the indefectible power or authority promised to Saint Peter and his successors by which the elected candidate formally becomes pope and actually takes hold of the office of the papacy.

The Thesis of Cassiciacum, as held by the Istituto Mater Boni Consilii and others, contends that both aspects are required and that if any candidate fails either one, he would not be elected to the office of pope. The Catholics adhering to the thesis hold that all claimants of the papal office from at least Paul VI to Francis are invalid and do not hold the papal office except by right of designation because of a failure to receive the form of the papacy (i.e. the authority) because his acceptance is impeded by a defective intention arising from their manifest disposition of apostasy.

According to des Lauriers's thesis, Paul VI, John Paul I, John Paul II, and possibly John XXIII, were or are defective popes because of their alleged espousal of modernism, which des Lauriers considers to be heresy. Thus, their consent to become pope was faulty or defective and so they were legally designated to be pope yet became deprived of attaining full succession to the authority of Peter. Des Lauriers's thesis holds that the Vatican II popes succeed as legal designees to the papacy and continue the line of Saint Peter materially, which means that the Vatican II popes are legitimate designees to be true popes but not formally. As such, they lack jurisdictional authority because of the obstacle that they posit to the reception of the authority. They are not the authority, true popes or true bishops, but they are legally in the position to become true popes and bishops if they remove the obstacle to the reception of the authority of the office. It is implicit that Benedict XVI and Francis would have received the same judgement from des Lauriers.

In explaining the position of sedeprivationism, sedevacantist bishop Donald Sanborn writes:
Because the power of designation to office pertains to the purely legal and material side of authority, the Novus Ordites possess the power to legitimately designate to positions of power, until such time as this power is legally removed from them.

As a result, there is a material hierarchy in place, i.e., someone legally nominated to be a pope, and others legally nominated to be bishops, and others legally nominated to be electors of popes, but none of these has any jurisdiction, and obedience is owed to none of them. Because they lack the authority, which is the form which makes them to be what they are, Ratzinger is a false pope and the bishops are false bishops. The cardinals are true electors, to the extent that they are legally nominated to be designators of the pope. But their role pertains to the material order of authority, the order of designation only.

Summary
In summary:
There is no real sede vacante state in the Catholic Church since a man fills the role of potential pope.
If the current potential pope recants from modernism and returns to Catholicism, he will complete the process and attain to the fullness of the papacy, all else being equal.

Differences with sedevacantism 
Sedeprivationism argues that since the Second Vatican Council, the elected popes are materially popes, though they have not attained the fullness of that office due to what sedeprivationists perceive as them holding the heresy of Modernism. This is contrasted with the position of sedevacantism, which asserts a vacancy in the papal office; the term sede vacante means "empty chair" in reference to the See of Saint Peter.

See also

 Independent Catholicism

Notes

References

Traditionalist Catholicism
Catholic terminology